Stephen Benjamin Parry  (born 2 March 1977) is an English former competitive swimmer who represented Great Britain in the Olympics, FINA world championships and European championships, and England in the Commonwealth Games.  He competed internationally in 100-metre and 200-metre butterfly events.

Career
After joining Stockport Metro, he set a Commonwealth record at the 2000 US Nationals in Seattle, beating, among others, a very young Michael Phelps. Later that year he qualified for his first Olympic Games in Sydney.

Four years later in Athens, Greece, Parry won Britain's first Olympic swimming medal in eight years at the Athens Summer Olympics in 200-metres butterfly, being beaten by Michael Phelps and Takashi Yamamoto. Phelps had beaten him into 4th place at Sydney four years earlier. Parry retired from competitive swimming in 2005.

He represented England and won a bronze medal in the 200 metres butterfly event, at the 1998 Commonwealth Games in Kuala Lumpur, Malaysia. Four years later he won a silver and bronze medal in the butterfly and relay events at the 2002 Commonwealth Games.

At the ASA National British Championships he won the 100 metres butterfly title in 1997  and was an eight-time winner of the 200 metres butterfly title in 1995, 1996, 1997, 2000, 2001, 2002, 2003 and 2004 .

After retiring, Parry joined up with former training partner Adrian Turner and Rebecca Adlington to establish Total Swimming, a swimming training program and facilities for young people. In June 2022, JD Sports announced they had purchased 60% of Total swimming group, after the group had made £8.6 million at the end of the 2021 fiscal year. JD purchased the stock with an initial cash consideration of £11.1 million with a maximum of £4 million.

He briefly hosted his own Sunday afternoon programme on BBC Radio Merseyside before joining BBC Sport as part of their team covering the swimming at the 2008 Beijing Olympics.

Personal life
Parry was diagnosed with testicular cancer in 2009, days after marrying his wife Thea. The affected testicle was removed before the cancer spread, and in early 2012 he became a father.

Parry was appointed Member of the Order of the British Empire (MBE) in the 2022 New Year Honours for services to swimming.

Personal bests and records

See also
 List of Commonwealth Games medallists in swimming (men)
 List of Olympic medalists in swimming (men)

References

British Swimming athlete profile
Profile

1977 births
Living people
English male swimmers
Swimmers at the 2000 Summer Olympics
Swimmers at the 2004 Summer Olympics
Swimmers at the 1998 Commonwealth Games
Swimmers at the 2002 Commonwealth Games
Olympic swimmers of Great Britain
Male butterfly swimmers
Olympic bronze medallists for Great Britain
Commonwealth Games silver medallists for England
Commonwealth Games bronze medallists for England
Sportspeople from Liverpool
Olympic bronze medalists in swimming
People educated at Liverpool Blue Coat School
Florida State University alumni
European Aquatics Championships medalists in swimming
Medalists at the 2004 Summer Olympics
Commonwealth Games medallists in swimming
Members of the Order of the British Empire
Medallists at the 1998 Commonwealth Games
Medallists at the 2002 Commonwealth Games